Basingstoke College of Technology (BCoT) is a further education college in Basingstoke, Hampshire, United Kingdom. The college is located in the centre of Basingstoke on Worting Road, and consists of three campus buildings: North, South, and STEM. The college is listed as a Centre of Vocational Excellence in certain areas, and was rated as 'Good' by Ofsted in 2016.

Courses
BCoT offers a wide range of vocational courses and qualifications on both a full-time and part-time basis. The courses are broken down into subject areas which include:
 Access to Higher Education
 Animal Management
 Art and Design
 Automotive
 Beauty Therapy and Media Make-Up
 Business
 Childcare
 Computer Science
 Construction
 Counselling
 Education and Training
 Engineering
 English and Maths
 Future Pathways
 Hair and Barbering
 Health and Social Care
 Hospitality and Catering
 Media and Games Design
 Public Services
 Science
 Specialist Provision
 Sport
 Travel and Tourism

Facilities
BCoT is well known for its wide range of industry-standard facilities which includes an in-house restaurant, known as The Restaurant at BCoT. Renovated in July 2012, the Restaurant at BCoT is open to the public and provides students with the chance to learn and gain experience in a professional environment.

Evolve Salon is BCoT's on-site training salon, which is also open to the public and is run by the Beauty Therapy and Hair and Barbering department. Opened in 2017, the Mike Taylor Barbering College is a training barbers for barbering students which is also open to the public and run in partnership with leading UK barber Mike Taylor.

As well as a restaurant, salon and barbers, the College also has an Animal Discover Centre, air cabin crew training room, onsite professional nursery (which is open to the public), a library, gym, science labs, large automotive workshop, three engineering workshops, lecture theatre and dedicated Art and Design studios.

Students are able to buy hot and cold food from an in-house catering outlet known as Taste @ BCoT who operate a refectory on the South Campus and a cafe on the North Campus.

Support for Students 
Students have access to an onsite professional counsellor, nurse, careers centre and English and Maths support hub, as well as a dedicated personal tutor.

References

College
Further education colleges in Hampshire